Pyhtää is a municipality of Finland.

Overview

The medieval church (as opposed to the municipality) is situated in the village of Itäkirkonkylä ("East Church Village"). During the Reformation, the rather beautiful and moving pictures on the walls were whitewashed over. Some years ago, they were rediscovered and the whitewash removed. The village lies just to the East of the westernmost tributary of the Kymi River and was at one time on the border between Russia and Sweden established by the Treaty of Åbo in 1743.

The municipality is bilingual with  speaking Finnish,  Swedish and  other languages as their first language.

In the 1980s, salmon soup, salted herrings and clot soup (klimppisoppa) were named as Pyhtää's traditional parish dishes.

Villages
 Heinlahti
 Hinkaböle
 Hirvikoski (earlier Österhirvikoski)
 Itäkirkonkylä
 Itämyllynkylä
 Kaunissaari
 Kiviniemi (earlier )
 Loosari
 Länsikirkonkylä
 Länsikylä (earlier )
 Länsimyllynkylä
 Malmi, Pyhtää
 Munapirtti
 Pirtnuora
 Siltakylä (earlier )
 Suur-Ahvenkoski
 Tuuski (de jure a part of Munapirtti)''
 Purola

Twinnings
 Haljala Parish, Estonia (since 1989)

References

External links
 
 Municipality of Pyhtää – Official website 
 Map of Pyhtää

 
Populated places established in the 1380s
Populated coastal places in Finland